The Advance-Guard, or The Military Sacrifice (The Ambush) is an 1890 oil painting by Frederic Remington.

Description
The painting depicts a cavalry scout slumping over his horse after being shot by an unseen Sioux warrior in ambush. Behind the scout are other mounted troops who are fleeing the ambush.

Provenance
In an auction of 1893 led by Thomas Ellis Kirby at the American Art Association, the painting was sold to E. H. Wales for US$250. It was acquired by the George F. Harding Museum some time before 1982. In 1982, ownership was transferred to the Art Institute of Chicago.

References

Horses in art
1890 paintings
Paintings by Frederic Remington
Paintings in the collection of the Art Institute of Chicago